Virginia Ruano Pascual and Paola Suárez were the defending champions and won in the final 6–2, 6–3, against Svetlana Kuznetsova and Martina Navratilova in straight sets. This was Ruano Pascual's 4th career Grand Slam doubles title and her 2nd title at the US Open. It was also Suárez' 4th career Grand Slam doubles title and her 2nd title at the US Open.

Seeds

Draw

Finals

Top half

Section 1

Section 2

Bottom half

Section 3

Section 4

References

External links
2003 US Open – Women's draws and results at the International Tennis Federation

Women's Doubles
US Open (tennis) by year – Women's doubles
2003 in women's tennis
2003 in American women's sports